The Cadillac SRX is a mid-size luxury SUV and compact luxury crossover SUV (CUV) manufactured and marketed by Cadillac over two generations: the first generation as a five-door, three-row, seven-passenger CUV (2003–2009), and the second generation as a five-door, two-row, five-passenger CUV (2010–2016) – the latter becoming Cadillac's best selling model in the United States.

First generation (2004)

Engine options included the  High-Feature V6 and the 4.6 L  Northstar V8. It was based on the GM Sigma platform and came with a five or six-speed automatic transmission; rear-wheel drive and four-wheel drive and MagneRide were available.  As a Sigma platform vehicle, the first generation SRX had a longitudinal mounted front engine, longitudinal transmission mounted behind the engine, and a rear drive differential.  The AWD option was implemented with a transfer case mounted to the rear of the transmission, with a propeller shaft forward to a front differential to power the front wheels.

An all-leather interior and curtain side airbags were standard in both models. Heated front seats and wood interior trim were standard in the V8 and available as options in the V6. DVD, sunroof, navigation system, and a power foldable third-row seat were all available options. However the third row was no longer available for the 2010 model year on the SRX.

The base price was US$38,880 for the V6 and US$45,880 for the V8 version.

The SRX won Car and Driver's Five Best Trucks "luxury SUV" award for 2004, 2005 and 2006 and was nominated for the North American Truck of the Year award for 2004.

The first generation SRX never had the V Series performance model available.

The first generation SRX was available through the 2009 model year.

The Insurance Institute for Highway Safety found the 2005-08 SRX worst in its class for driver fatalities with a death rate of 63 compared to its class average of 23.

2005 changes 
For the 2005 model year, Cadillac added chrome accents to the gauge cluster and made the towing package available on V6 models and V8 models.

2006 changes 
For 2006, power tailgate and satellite radio became standard. New wheel designs were also added. New interior wood trim was added to the center stack and ride height was lowered slightly.

2007 changes 
For the 2007 model year, a new console was implemented, V8 models received six-speed automatic transmission, and base audio system was changed to Bose. A Sport package was added which included 20-inch wheels, all-wheel drive and limited slip differential. Other added options include Bose 5.1 digital surround sound, Theater package (which included Bose 5.1 digital surround sound, navigation and rear seat entertainment), automatic odor filtration, and Passenger Side Inflatable Restraint Suppression.

2008 changes 
The 2008 SRX received a new three-spoke steering wheel design.

2009 changes 
Adaptive Remote Start was added as a new option for the 2009 model year.

Second generation (2010)

The second generation SRX followed the Provoq concept vehicle, using a variation of the Epsilon II platform. The V8 was no longer available. Production began in 2009 as a 2010 model, with an initial $34,155 MSRP.  As it was based on the Epsilon platform, the second generation SRX drivetrain was a front transverse mounted V6 engine with a transverse mounted transaxle powering the front wheels.  The AWD option was implemented with a power take-off output of the transaxle, and a propeller shaft to a rear differential to power the rear wheels.

The SRX debuted in January 2009  with the choice of a 3.0 liter V6 with direct injection derived from the 3.6 liter unit in the Cadillac CTS, or a 2.8 liter turbocharged V6.

2016 was the last model year for the SRX as Cadillac replaced it by the XT5 in the spring of 2016 as a 2017 model.

2011 changes 
For the 2011 model year, a rear backup camera and Cadillac Premium Care Maintenance program became standard and full keyless access became standard on Luxury and Performance models. In January 2011, General Motors discontinued production of the 2.8 liter turbo-charged V6 engine in the SRX, citing poor sales numbers. Less than 10 percent of SRX buyers opted for the turbo-charged engine. This left the naturally aspirated 3.0 liter V6 as the only engine available for the remainder of the 2011 model year.

2012 changes 
For 2012, a 3.6 liter V6 with E85 flex-fuel capability was offered in the turbo V6's place. The six-speed transmission received an Eco feature for improved fuel economy. Other additions include Xenon Blue exterior color and ebony interior. Also, Bluetooth hands-free technology became standard on all trims and a heated steering wheel became available.

2013 facelift 
For the 2013 model year, all trim levels of the SRX receive an infotainment system marketed as the "Cadillac User Experience" (CUE) as well as new safety features and active noise cancellation technology. Additional interior features included standard HD radio, Bluetooth audio streaming, additional USB ports, SD card slot and 12-volt outlet, revised headphone and remote design for rear seat entertainment, and revised shift knob, steering wheel, and instrument cluster. The front styling and faux fender vents were revised. Three new colors: Evolution Green Metallic, Glacier Blue Metallic and Silver Coast Metallic were added, and wheels options were revised.

2014 changes 
For the 2014 model year, 18-inch chrome wheels were added to the Luxury trim and the Driver Awareness package received Intellibeam headlights. Exterior colors Graphite Metallic, Terra Mocha Metallic, and Sapphire Blue Metallic were added caramel and ebony interior accents became options.

2015 changes 
The 2015 SRX added 4G LTE connection and a standard Wi-Fi hotspot. Exterior colors Cocoa Bronze Metallic and Majestic Plum Metallic were added.

2016 changes 
For 2016, Cadillac removed the Majestic Plum Metallic color.

Safety recall
In May 2010, General Motors recalled about 550 of its 2010 Cadillac SRXs with the turbocharged 2.8-liter V-6 because of a possible engine failure if owners use regular gas and drove aggressively. The automaker said the fuel-filler lid and owner's manual warn that the engine should not be worked hard if regular fuel is used. Failures in several vehicles owned by GM and one external user led it to discover that using regular fuel and driving hard could cause possible internal engine damage including connecting rod failures. The automaker decided to conduct a "customer satisfaction program" to recalibrate the engine computer, but the NHTSA considered engine failures to be a safety issue and argued that a recall was required. The 2.8 liter V6 was permanently removed from production after the 2010 model year due to safety recalls and poor sales. 3.0L V6 was the only engine option available for the 2011 model year. The 3.0L V6 was replaced by a 3.6L V6 engine for the 2012 model year as the only engine option available.

Safety

1 vehicle structure rated "Good"
2 strength-to-weight ratio: 4.14

Engines and transmissions

Sales

References

External links

 
 
 2016 Cadillac SRX Review at Edmunds

SRX
Luxury sport utility vehicles
Luxury crossover sport utility vehicles
Mid-size sport utility vehicles
All-wheel-drive vehicles
Rear-wheel-drive vehicles
2010s cars
Cars introduced in 2003
Vehicles built in Lansing, Michigan
Motor vehicles manufactured in the United States